is a video game developed by Keys Factory which was released in Japan on July 5, 2007, and in North America on May 19, 2009.

Story
In the game, a planet much like Earth has been affected by a horrible viral outbreak. Anybody infected turns into a weird monster with a pun for a name, such as the Flying Panduh, a panda with a jetpack, a frying pan and an aversion to country music. As the outbreak worsens, Dr. Kevin and his two assistants decide to take a stand against the disease using their newly invented vaccine.

Characters

Dr. Kevin
The main character of the game. A kind, eccentric genius who spends most of his time working in his lab.

Honeydew
Dr. Kevin's assistant. She's smart, quiet, and librarian-like. She'll speak her mind if she thinks it's important and loves to cook even though she's bad at it.

George the Chicken
Kevin's other assistant. George claims to be a girl, but nobody's sure. Kevin and Honeydew suspect she might be infected with the Puchirus.

Gameplay

Single player
The game challenges players to link geometric viruses together to erase them before they turn into stones. Links are created by linking three viruses together into a triangle; and then 'popping' this triangle to remove the viruses. Combos can be created by overlapping two triangles and then popping the first triangle created. There are 102 levels within the game, each having a different objective (a certain score, a certain number of combos etc. within a varying time limit).

Multiplayer
Multiplayer function of the game is head-to-head with single- and multi-card play.

References

Further reading

External links
Official Website
Kotaku
Puchi Puchi Review at ArsGeek

2007 video games
Nintendo DS games
Nintendo DS-only games
Puzzle video games
Nippon Ichi Software games
Video games developed in Japan
Multiplayer and single-player video games
Jaleco games
Video games about viral outbreaks
Video games set on fictional planets